The Wagner FJ-V3 Aerocar was a prototype 4-place flying automobile. The vehicle used counter-rotating rotor helicopter technology for flight.

Design
The Aerocar was developed in the era of space-age futurism, and looked the part. It looked slightly like the Jetsons flying car, with a large bubble cockpit, tailfins, and disproportionately small wheels for a car. It was developed from the Rotocar III design which was based on the Sky-trac 3 helicopter. The helicopter used counter-rotating rotors.  On ground propulsion to the wheels was through a hydraulic linkage to the engine.

Operational history
A prototype with the registration D-HAGU was completed and flown in 1965. The Franklin 6AS-335-B engine was replaced with a 134lb, 420shp Turbomeca Oredon turbine engine with a front-mounted gearbox. The design was sold to Helikopter Technik München (HTM). HTM suspended development of the Aerocar in 1971.

Variants
HTM Skytrac

Specifications Wagner Aerocar

References

External links

Flight International, June 1968 
Aero Engines; Flight International, January 2, 1969

Aerocar, Wagner
Single-turbine helicopters
1960s German helicopters
Aircraft first flown in 1965
Single-engined piston helicopters
Wagner aircraft